Sami Zubaida (born 1937 in Iraq), left Iraq in 1953 at the age of sixteen. He is now an Emeritus Professor of Politics and Sociology at Birkbeck, University of London and, as a Visiting Hauser Global Professor of Law in Spring 2006, taught Law and Politics in the Islamic World at New York University School of Law. He is a regular participant at the Oxford Symposium on Food and Cookery, and organized a conference at the London School of Oriental and African Studies, in 1992, which focused on the culinary cultures of the Middle East. The conference papers were published in book form in 1994.

Writings
 1994 (editor, with Richard Tapper) : Culinary Cultures of the Middle East. London: I. B. Tauris.

Bibliography
 Robert Irwin, "In the Caliph's Kitchen" in Times Literary Supplement (23 December 1994) p. 10 [review of Culinary Cultures of the Middle East]

References

External links
Zubaida's web page at U. London website

Academics of Birkbeck, University of London
Academics of the University of Leicester
Living people
1937 births
British food writers
American political scientists